David Špiler (born 2 January 1983) is a Slovenian handball player who plays for Hapoel Ashdod.

He has taken part in many international events including the 2007 World Men's Handball Championship in Germany.

References

1983 births
Living people
Sportspeople from Kranj
Slovenian male handball players
Expatriate handball players
Slovenian expatriate sportspeople in Croatia
Slovenian expatriate sportspeople in Belarus
Slovenian expatriate sportspeople in North Macedonia
Slovenian expatriate sportspeople in Germany
Slovenian expatriate sportspeople in Israel
21st-century Slovenian people